White Suffolk is an Australian breed of meat sheep developed for Australian conditions. Work commenced on a breeding program in the mid-1970s with experimentation conducted by Professor E. Roberts (University of New South Wales). His aim was to produce a breed with the conformation, structure and growth of the Suffolk but with a white head, legs and body. Professor Roberts had observed that despite the Suffolk breed producing clearly the best lambs, it commanded only a small share of the Australian prime lamb market. The main reason for this reluctance was caused by the dark points and the reduced skin values, in which dropped prices dramatically. In the 1980s other breeders also took up the challenge to develop the breed with improved quality and numbers. It was then developed from breeding programs involving the Suffolk breed, initially, crossed with a white breed (mainly Poll Dorsets).

The White Suffolk is producing good results in a variety of pastoral, mixed farming and higher rainfall districts.

In 1992 U.S. genetics became available and have now been infused into a percentage of White Suffolk studs. Artificial insemination is used by breeders to source superior genetics that are available to association members.

Associations
The Australian White Suffolk Association was established in 1985 and aims to produce a breed that has all the Suffolk characteristics except the black points, while maintaining the superior growth rate and ability to produce carcasses ideally suited to all sections in the meat industry.

References

Sheep breeds originating in Australia
Sheep breeds